Candacia worthingtoni  is a species of copepod in the order Calanoida first described by George Grice in 1981 under the basionym Paracandacia worthingtoni. The species is named for the scientist emeritus Valentine Worthington, as a tribute to his contributions to the field of physical oceanography.

References 

Calanoida